"Spirits" is a song by Canadian indie folk band The Strumbellas. It was produced by Dave Schiffman and was released as a single from the band's third album, Hope, in 2016.

Music video
The official music video was released on January 28, 2016. It depicts the band performing the song at a funeral where all the mourners are wearing masks and costumes. During the procession, it becomes a lively parade based on a jazz funeral.

In popular culture
The song was used in the film  Middle School: The Worst Years of My Life in 2016.

In 2020, the song went viral on TikTok, with a slowed down version, and a remix version made by DragoKG. It has been in more than 289.7K videos on TikTok as of March 23, 2021.

As a result of the viral popularity of "Spirits" on TikTok, on September 10, 2020, the band re-released an official lyric video to the song more than 5 years since it was released to YouTube, which received more than 837K views as of March 23, 2022. A bittersweet nostalgia themed clip comparing then and now footage of famous celebrities has been used on social media websites using this song.

Charts

Weekly charts

Year-end charts

Certifications

References

2015 songs
2015 debut singles
The Strumbellas songs
Glassnote Records singles
Juno Award for Single of the Year singles
Viral videos